Semen Leonidovych Klyuchyk (born 23 December 1997) is a Ukrainian football defender who plays for Ukrainian side AFSC Kyiv.

Career
Klyuchyk is a product of FC Metalurh Zaporizhzhia youth team system. His first trainer was Dmytro Vysotskyi.

He made his debut for Metalurh Zaporizhzhia in the Ukrainian Premier League in a match against FC Volyn Lutsk on 29 November 2015.

References

External links
 
 

1997 births
Living people
Ukrainian footballers
Association football defenders
FC Metalurh Zaporizhzhia players
FC Chornomorets Odesa players
FC Vorskla Poltava players
AFSC Kyiv players
Ukrainian Premier League players
Ukrainian Second League players
Footballers from Zaporizhzhia